Edward Dusinberre (born 1968 in Leamington Spa, England) is a British/American violinist.

Biography
Edward Dusinberre is first violinist of the Takács Quartet and Artist in Residence at the University of Colorado Boulder. His second book "Distant Melodies: Music in Search of Home" is published by Faber and Faber and the University of Chicago Press in November 2022. His first book "Beethoven for a Later Age: The Journey of a String Quartet" was published in 2016 and that year won a Royal Philharmonic Society Award in the Creative Communication category. Dusinberre studied with the Ukrainian violinist Felix Andrievsky at the Royal College of Music in London and at the Juilliard School with Dorothy DeLay and Piotr Milewski. In 1990 he won the British Violin Recital Prize and gave his debut recital in London in the Purcell Room of South Bank Centre. He joined the Takács Quartet in 1993.

Performances and recordings
Based in Boulder at the University of Colorado, the Takács Quartet performs ninety concerts a year worldwide, throughout Europe as well as in Australia, New Zealand, Japan and South Korea. The Quartet's award-winning recordings include the complete Beethoven Cycle on the Decca label. In 2005 the Late Beethoven Quartets won Disc of the Year and Chamber Award from BBC Music Magazine, a Gramophone Award and a Japanese Record Academy Award. Their recordings of the early and middle Beethoven quartets won a Grammy, another Gramophone Award, a Chamber Music of America Award and two further awards from the Japanese Recording Academy. Since 2005 the Takács Quartet has recorded for the Hyperion label, making critically acclaimed CDs of Schubert, Brahms, Schumann, Franck, Debussy, Haydn, Janáček, Fanny Mendelssohn Hensel and Felix Mendelssohn, amongst others. The group's recording of piano quintets by Elgar and Beach won a Gramophone Award in 2021. 

Dusinberre regularly performs as a recitalist and concerto soloist. He has recorded Beethoven’s Kreutzer Sonata and Opus 96 for the Decca label with pianist David Korevaar.

Teaching and writing
With his Takács Quartet colleagues, Dusinberre teaches at the University of Colorado, Boulder. Dusinberre is a member of the Faculty at the Music Academy of the West, Santa Barbara and a Visiting Fellow of the Guildhall School of Music.

Dusinberre writes about music.  In addition to his two books, he wrote an essay "A Winter Drive" for  "Ways of Hearing: Reflections on Music in 26 Pieces", published by Princeton University Press in 2021. He has written articles for the Financial Times, Los Angeles Times, Radio Times, Strad magazine, Massachusetts Review and The Guardian.

Interdisciplinary programming
Dusinberre is well known for his innovative program ideas, devising amongst others a project with the poet Robert Pinsky that toured throughout the USA, mixing love poetry with the music of Janáček, Britten and Barber. In 2007 he created a program called "Everyman" inspired by Philip Roth's novel of that name. The award-winning actor Philip Seymour Hoffman read extracts from the novel, surrounded by the music of Arvô Pärt, Philip Glass and concluding with a performance of Schubert's Death and the Maiden.

A collaboration with writer David Lawrence Morse led to Morse’s play Quartet, a drama that explores the circumstances surrounding the composition of Beethoven’s Late Quartets.

References

External links
 Takacs Quartet official website

1968 births
Living people
British classical violinists
British male violinists
Alumni of the Royal College of Music
Juilliard School alumni
University of Colorado Boulder faculty
21st-century classical violinists
21st-century British male musicians
Male classical violinists